Infanta Catherine of Portugal, Duchess of Braganza by marriage (18 January 1540 – 15 November 1614) was a Portuguese infanta (princess) claimant to the throne following the death of King Henry of Portugal in 1580.

Life
She was the second daughter of Edward, Duke of Guimarães (sixth son of Manuel I of Portugal) and Isabel of Braganza, she was married to John I, Duke of Braganza, a descendant of earlier Portuguese monarchs, and head of the most important aristocratic House in Portugal. The duchess had several children, of whom Theodosius of Braganza, was her eldest surviving son. When King Henry died (1580), Edward's issue were the only surviving legitimate heirs of any of the sons of King Manuel I of Portugal. As the male line is preferred in Portuguese succession before the female one, descendants of Manuel I's daughters (such as king Philip II of Spain) had, in principle, only a weaker claim to the throne than Edward's descendants, to whom Catherine belonged.

Following this principle, the first in line to the throne would have been Catherine's nephew Ranuccio I Farnese of Parma, as that 11-year-old Italian boy was the heir of her elder sister Maria of Guimarães. Catherine was an ambitious, cunning and power-hungry woman who participated in court intrigues, hoping to become the ruler of Portugal and reinforce the position of the House of Braganza as the most powerful noble family in the Iberian Peninsula.

Her cousin, King Philip II of Spain, used his descent as son of Infanta Isabella, eldest daughter of king Manuel I. Her other cousin Anthony, Prior of Crato was a male, though illegitimate. Anthony had already in 1578 claimed the throne.

Catherine had married the Duke of Braganza, John, who himself as a grandson of the late James, Duke of Braganza, was a legitimate heir of Portugal. The Duchess' son, Teodósio of Braganza, would have been their royal heir and successor to the throne.

The duchess's claim was relatively strong, as it was reinforced by her husband's position as one of the legitimate heirs; thus they would both be entitled to hold the kingship. Her claim was also strengthened by the fact that she was living in Portugal, and was a mature woman of forty. However, Portugal had not yet had a generally recognized queen regnant, but only males on the throne.  Moreover, she was a younger daughter, thus there was a genealogically senior claimant, her nephew Ranuccio.

Philip II of Spain tried to bribe Catherine's husband, the Duke of Braganza, to abandon his wife's pretensions, offering him the Vice-Kingdom of Brazil, the post of Grand-Master of the Order of Christ, a license to send a personal ship to India every year, and the marriage of one of his daughters to Diego, Prince of Asturias, Philip's heir at that time. The Duke of Braganza, influenced by Catherine, refused the proposal.

She failed in the struggle: the strongest claimant was her cousin Philip II of Spain who wanted to unite Portugal in a personal union with the other Spanish kingdoms under himself. The nationalist party, those who desired Portugal to remain independent, supported her illegitimate cousin Anthony of Crato, not Catherine. Anthony lost the final competition to Philip in the Battle of Alcântara in 1580.

Shortly thereafter, she lost her husband John of Braganza (1543–1583). She lived on as a widow under the rule of her Castilian cousin and worked hard to pave the way for her descendants to take the Portuguese throne, which finally happened in 1640.

In 1640, Catherine's grandson and direct heir, the then Duke of Braganza, became King John IV of Portugal. The Duchess was then retrospectively acknowledged as the legitimate heir, as result of her descendants obtaining the throne, although in her own lifetime she was only one of several possible heirs. By the unanimous voice of the people John was raised to the throne of Portugal during the revolution effected on December 1, 1640 against the Spanish king, Philip IV.

Offspring
Catherine and her husband had the following children:
 Maria of Braganza (1565–1592). 
 Seraphina of Braganza (1566–1604), married Juan Fernandez Pacheco, 5th Duke of Escalona, and had issue. Note 7.
 Teodosio of Braganza (1568–1630), succeeded his father as Duke of Braganza; father of King John IV of Portugal.
 Edward of Braganza, 1st Marquis of Frechilla. 
 Alexander of Braganza, Archbishop of Évora. 
 Cherubina of Braganza (1572–1580). 
 Angelica of Braganza (1573–1576). 
 Isabella of Braganza (1578–1582). 
 Philip of Braganza (1581–1608).

Ancestry

References 

1540 births
1614 deaths
Duchesses of Braganza
Portuguese infantas
House of Aviz
House of Braganza
People from Lisbon